The Country Junction store began in 1984 as The Service Team insulation and construction company and added hardware sales and a home center. It was renamed Country Junction in 1997 and expanded to include home, garden, gifts, and decor items.

The main building located in Forest Inn near Lehighton, Pennsylvania kept growing over the years, with construction workers from The Service Team side of the business doing the work.

Country Junction at one time had outlets in Wind Gap, Quakertown, Wilkes-Barre, Whitehall and Hazleton,  Pennsylvania, but it was the main store that became a landmark tourist destination.

Being dubbed "The World's Largest General Store," many people traveled out of state to visit or shop in the impressive store. It was featured on the Travel Channel.

On the morning of October 3, 2006, the family-owned retail store in Lehighton was leveled by a fire.

The store was known for its animated figures, life-size statuary, and themed areas such as a "Pirates Cove," "A Bit of Italy," "The Wharf," and a rain forest. They also featured wildlife exhibits, a restaurant with theater, a coffee shop, and a petting zoo.

In November 2006, Country Junction opened their temporary store on the adjacent property under a gigantic white tent making the lumberyard, pet shop, home decor items, hardware, and rentals available for customers.

In June 2009, the store's owner, Jim Everett, began the rebuild of the Lehighton store. The newly rebuilt store opened on February 13, 2010. The new store offers many items from food and household goods to home improvement supplies and taxidermy.

External links 
 Country Junction Store's main site.
 Country Junction Breaks Ground On New Store
 Country Junction to break ground
 Country Junction Fire Aftermath – Audio Slide Show
 Country Junction Resumes Operations Under Tent
 At the Junction of Hope and Resolve

Retail companies of the United States
Pocono Mountains
Companies based in Carbon County, Pennsylvania
American companies established in 1984
1984 establishments in Pennsylvania